Lùnapop was an Italian pop rock music group active between 1999 and 2001.

Lùnapop released its lone full length Italian-language album, ...Squérez?, in 1999.  The album quickly became a commercial success,  with the single "50 special", hitting the number one spot in the Italian charts in 1999, and ...Squérez? being the third-best selling album in Italy in 2000. The band won awards as Italy's best band, best album, and best newcomer in 2000.

Lùnapop was also nominated for a 2000 MTV Europe Music Award, and won the 2000 Festivalbar award with their single "Qualcosa di grande".

Break up
Lùnapop split up in 2001. Lead singer Cesare Cremonini pursued a successful solo career. His Lùnapop bandmate, Nicola 'Ballo' Balestri, joined him in his new band, along with other musicians. Since going solo, Cremonini has released six solo studio albums: Bagus, Maggese, Il primo bacio sulla Luna, La teoria dei colori, Logico, and Possibili scenari. Solo hits include "Vieni a vedere perché," "Latin Lover," "Gongi-Boy," "Marmellata #25," "Dicono di me" and "Figlio di un re." 
Alessandro De Simone, Gabriele Galassi and Andrea Capoti formed the band Liberpool in 2008. Their first single, "Sotto i portici," was released in 2009 and was followed by an album called LP. 
Michele Giuliani retired from the music industry.

Members
Cesare Cremonini (born in Bologna, 27 March 1980) – vocals and piano
Andrea Capoti (Gallipoli, 3 July 1980) – percussion
Michele Giuliani (Bologna, 14 August 1980) – electric guitar
Alessandro de Simone (Bologna, 19 October 1980) – drums
Gabriele Galassi (Bologna, 27 January 1981) – acoustic guitar
Nicola "Ballo" Balestri (Bologna, 20 June 1982) – bass guitar

Discography

Albums
1999: ...Squérez?

Singles
1999: "50 special"
2000: "Un giorno migliore"
2000: "Qualcosa di grande"
2000: "Se ci sarai"
2001: "Resta con me"
2001: "Vorrei"

References

External links
Official website (in Italian)

Italian pop music groups
Musical groups established in 1999
Musical groups disestablished in 2002
Musical groups from Bologna
1999 establishments in Italy